Keenum is a surname. Notable people with the surname include:

 Case Keenum (born 1988), American football player
 Mark E. Keenum (born 1961), American collegiate president
 Rhonda Keenum (born 1961), American lobbyist

English-language surnames